Del Cerro Park is a public park located in Rancho Palos Verdes, Los Angeles County, California.  The park is situated high atop a bluff at the southernmost end of Crenshaw Boulevard.  Del Cerro Park is noted for its sweeping views of the Pacific Ocean and Catalina Island.

References

External links
Palosverdes.com: Del Cerro Park

Parks in Los Angeles County, California
Palos Verdes Peninsula
Municipal parks in California